More Stories by Frank O'Connor is a 1954 short story collection featuring both old and new stories by the Irish writer Frank O'Connor. A similar collection was published in the U.K. in 1964 as Collection Two.

Contents
The new stories appearing here in book form for the first time were:
Eternal Triangle
The Face of Evil
Masculine Protest
The Sorcerer's Apprentice
A Romantic (no relation to "A Romantic" from Bones of Contention)
The Little Mother
A Sense of Responsibility
Counsel For Oedipus (alternate title: A Brief For Oedipus)
A Torrent Damned
The Old Faith
Vanity
Father and Son
Unapproved Route
Lonely Rock

References

1954 short story collections
Short story collections by Frank O'Connor
Works by Frank O'Connor
Alfred A. Knopf books